William J. Arblaster (born 1892, date of death unknown) was an English professional footballer. His clubs included Merthyr Town and Gillingham. He made nearly 150 Football League appearances.

References

1892 births
Year of death missing
People from Darlaston
English footballers
Association football inside forwards
Darlaston Town F.C. players
Merthyr Town F.C. players
Gillingham F.C. players
Leamington F.C. players
English Football League players